Mahabub Ara Begum Gini (born 1 August 1961) is a Bangladesh Awami League politician, member of parliament, and a whip in the parliament.

Biography
Gini graduated from the University of Dhaka. She was elected to Parliament from Gaibandha-2 in 2009 as a candidate of Bangladesh Awami League. She won the nomination for the 2014 general election in 2013, despite some opposition from local party members of Bangladesh Awami League. She would win the election in 2014. She is a member of the Parliamentary Standing Committee on Women and Children Affairs. The body has called for the introduction of housing for female workers in rural areas.

In April 2017 Gini was elected vice-president of Bangladesh Olympic Association for a four-year term. In June 2017 she distributed aid for flood victims in her constituency of Gaibandha.

Controversy
On 5 March 2012, Gini criticised Khaleda Zia and questioned the paternity of her son Tarique Rahman on the floor of the parliament. Her speech was criticised by The Daily Star who called the speech "vile". Minority rights group, Bangladesh Hindu-Buddhist-Christian Unity Council, have accused her of grabbing the land of minorities.

References

Awami League politicians
Living people
University of Dhaka alumni
1961 births
10th Jatiya Sangsad members
11th Jatiya Sangsad members
Women members of the Jatiya Sangsad
21st-century Bangladeshi women politicians